Oil engine  may refer to:

 Hornsby-Akroyd oil engine, the first internal combustion engine using heavy oil as fuel
 Crude oil engine, an internal combustion engine which can use many kinds of oil as fuel
 Oil burner (engine), a steam engine that uses oil as its fuel
 Hot bulb engine
 Hesselman engine

See also
 Diesel engine

nn:Råoljemotor